The conservation and restoration of copper and copper-alloy objects is the preservation and protection of objects of historical and personal value made from copper or copper alloy. When applied to items of cultural heritage, this activity is generally undertaken by a conservator-restorer.

Historically, objects made from copper or copper alloy were created for religious, artistic, technical, military, and domestic uses. The act of conservation and restoration strives to prevent and slow the deterioration of the object as well as protecting the object for future use. The prevention and removal of surface dirt and corrosion products are the primary concerns of conservator-restorers when dealing with copper or copper-alloy objects.

History

Copper Age

Copper occurs naturally as native copper and was known to some of the oldest civilizations on record. It has a history of use that is at least 10,000 years old, and estimates of its discovery place it at 9000 BC in the Middle East; a copper pendant was found in northern Iraq that dates to 8700 BC. There is evidence that gold and meteoric iron (but not iron smelting) were the only metals used by humans before copper. The history of copper metallurgy is thought to have followed the following sequence: 1) cold working of native copper, 2) annealing, 3) smelting, and 4) the lost wax method. In southeastern Anatolia, all four of these metallurgical techniques appears more or less simultaneously at the beginning of the Neolithic c. 7500 BC. However, just as agriculture was independently invented in several parts of the world (including Pakistan, China, and the Americas) copper smelting was invented locally in several different places. It was probably discovered independently in China before 2800 BC, in Central America perhaps around 600 AD, and in West Africa about the 9th or 10th century AD. Investment casting was invented in 4500–4000 BC in Southeast Asia and carbon dating has established mining at Alderley Edge in Cheshire, UK at 2280 to 1890 BC. Ötzi the Iceman, a male dated from 3300–3200 BC, was found with an axe with a copper head 99.7% pure; high levels of arsenic in his hair suggest his involvement in copper smelting. Experience with copper has assisted the development of other metals; in particular, copper smelting led to the discovery of iron smelting. Production in the Old Copper Complex in Michigan and Wisconsin is dated between 6000 and 3000 BC. Natural bronze, a type of copper made from ores rich in silicon, arsenic, and (rarely) tin, came into general use in the Balkans around 5500 BC. Previously the only tool made of copper had been the awl, used for punching holes in leather and gouging out peg-holes for wood joining. However, the introduction of a more robust form of copper led to the widespread use, and large-scale production of heavy metal tools, including axes, adzes, and axe-adzes.

Bronze Age

Alloying copper with tin to make bronze was first practiced about 4000 years after the discovery of copper smelting, and about 2000 years after "natural bronze" had come into general use. Bronze artifacts from Sumerian cities and Egyptian artifacts of copper and bronze alloys date to 3000 BC. The Bronze Age began in Southeastern Europe around 3700 - 3300 BC, in Northwestern Europe about 2500 BC. It ended with the beginning of the Iron Age, 2000-1000 BC in the Near East, 600 BC in Northern Europe. The transition between the Neolithic period and the Bronze Age was formerly termed the Chalcolithic period (copper-stone), with copper tools being used with stone tools. This term has gradually fallen out of favor because in some parts of the world the Calcholithic and Neolithic are coterminous at both ends. Brass, an alloy of copper and zinc, is of much more recent origin. It was known to the Greeks, but became a significant supplement to bronze during the Roman Empire.

Antiquity and Middle Ages

In Greece, copper was known by the name  (χαλκός). It was an important resource for the Romans, Greeks and other ancient peoples. In Roman times, it was known as aes Cyprium, aes being the generic Latin term for copper alloys and Cyprium from Cyprus, where much copper was mined. The phrase was simplified to cuprum, hence the English copper. Aphrodite and Venus represented copper in mythology and alchemy, because of its lustrous beauty, its ancient use in producing mirrors, and its association with Cyprus, which was sacred to the goddess. The seven heavenly bodies known to the ancients were associated with the seven metals known in antiquity, and Venus was assigned to copper.

Britain's first use of brass occurred around the 3rd–2nd century BC. In North America, copper mining began with marginal workings by Native Americans. Native copper is known to have been extracted from sites on Isle Royale with primitive stone tools between 800 and 1600. Copper metallurgy was flourishing in South America, particularly in Peru around 1000 AD; it proceeded at a much slower rate on other continents. Copper burial ornamentals from the 15th century have been uncovered, but the metal's commercial production did not start until the early 20th century.

The cultural role of copper has been important, particularly in currency. Romans in the 6th through 3rd centuries BC used copper lumps as money. At first, the copper itself was valued, but gradually the shape and look of the copper became more important. Julius Caesar had his own coins made from brass, while Octavianus Augustus Caesar's coins were made from Cu-Pb-Sn alloys. With an estimated annual output of around 15,000 t, Roman copper mining and smelting activities reached a scale unsurpassed until the time of the Industrial Revolution; the provinces most intensely mined were those of Hispania, Cyprus and in Central Europe.

The gates of the Temple of Jerusalem used Corinthian bronze made by depletion gilding. It was most prevalent in Alexandria, where alchemy is thought to have begun. In ancient India, copper was used in the holistic medical science Ayurveda for surgical instruments and other medical equipment. Ancient Egyptians (~2400 BC) used copper for sterilizing wounds and drinking water, and later on for headaches, burns, and itching. The Baghdad Battery, with copper cylinders soldered to lead, dates back to 248 BC to AD 226 and resembles a galvanic cell, leading people to believe this was the first battery; the claim has not been verified.

Modern period

The Great Copper Mountain was a mine in Falun, Sweden, that operated from the 10th century to 1992. It produced two thirds of Europe's copper demand in the 17th century and helped fund many of Sweden's wars during that time. It was referred to as the nation's treasury; Sweden had a copper backed currency.

The uses of copper in art were not limited to currency: it was used by Renaissance sculptors, in photographic technology known as the daguerreotype, and the Statue of Liberty. Copper plating and copper sheathing for ships' hulls was widespread; the ships of Christopher Columbus were among the earliest to have this feature. The Norddeutsche Affinerie in Hamburg was the first modern electroplating plant starting its production in 1876. The German scientist Gottfried Osann invented powder metallurgy in 1830 while determining the metal's atomic mass; around then it was discovered that the amount and type of alloying element (e.g., tin) to copper would affect bell tones. Flash smelting was developed by Outokumpu in Finland and first applied at Harjavalta in 1949; the energy-efficient process accounts for 50% of the world's primary copper production.

The Intergovernmental Council of Copper Exporting Countries, formed in 1967 with Chile, Peru, Zaire and Zambia, played a similar role for copper as OPEC does for oil. It never achieved the same influence, particularly because the second-largest producer, the United States, was never a member; it was dissolved in 1988.

Metallurgy

Corrosion

Conservation

Historical objects

Documentation
Systematic and well-managed documentation is today an essential prerequisite for quality executed conservation and restoration treatments, including documentation of the state of objects before, during and after treatment. Identification of   materials and procedures used to produce  object and the results of any scientific research  must be  part of  documentation too. Last but not least, an integral part of the documentation must be a recommendation for further care of object.

Research
identification of metals, alloys and metallic coatings
identification of other organic/inorganic materials
identification of corrosion products and processes
identification of technology used to produce object

Decision making
In preparing the strategy  of the metals conservation project   interdisciplinary approach to the same is  essential. It implies the participation of as many experts as is possible, as a minimum,  we can take  curator (archaeologist, historian, art historian), scientists specialized for corrosion  of metallic objects of cultural heritage and the  conservator - restorer

Cleaning

Consolidation

Stabilization
benzotriazole

Protective coatings
clearcoats - Paraloid B-72 - Incralac - Ormocer - Everbrite Coating - Pantarol A
waxes - Renaissance Wax - Cosmolloid 80 H - Dinitrol 4010 - Poligen ES 91 009
combinations - Paraloid B-72 + topcoat Renaissance Wax etc.

Archaeology objects

Documentation

Research

Decision making

Cleaning
mechanical
-Microsandblasting

-Dry ice blasting

-Scalpel or scraper

High speed micromotor

-Steel or ceramic burs and cutters

-Abrasive wheels

-Wire brushes

-Glass fibre brushes and pens

-Setting hammer

Consolidation

Stabilization
chloride removal
corrosion inhibitors
-benzotriazole.

-4 methyl imidazole

-tannin

-ammonium sulphide

Protective coatings
clearcoats - Paraloid B-72 - Incralac - Ormocer - Everbrite Coating - Pantarol A
waxes - Renaissance Wax - Cosmolloid 80 H - Dinitrol 4010 - Poligen ES 91 009
combinations - Paraloid B-72 + topcoat Renaissance Wax etc.

Preventive conservation
The items should be stored in rooms that are protected from polluted air, dust, ultraviolet radiation, and excessive relative humidity - ideal values are temperature of 16-20 °C and up to 40%(35-55% according to recent Canadian Conservation Institute recommendations) relative humidity, noting that if metal is combined with organic materials, relative humidity should not be below 45%. Archaeological objects must be stored in rooms (or plastic boxes) with very low relative humidity, or in the case of particularly valuable items in the chambers with nitrogen or argon. Copper or copper alloy objects with active corrosion up to 35% RH. Shelves in the storerooms must be of stainless steel or chlorine and acetate free plastic or powder coated steel. Wood and wood based products (particle board, plywood) must be avoided. Also do not use rubber, felt or wool. When you are handling metal objects, always wear clean cotton gloves . Lighting levels must be kept below 300 lux (up to 150 lux in case of lacquered or painted objects, up to 50 lux in case of objects with light sensitive materials).

See also
 Conservation and restoration of metals
 Conservation and restoration of ferrous objects
 Conservation and restoration of glass objects
 Conservation and restoration of ivory objects
 Conservation and restoration of ceramic objects
 Conservation and restoration of silver objects

References

Further reading

Books
Selwyn, L.  Metals and Corrosion - A Handbook for the Conservation Professional, Ottawa 2004.
Scott, D.A. Metallography and Microstructure of Ancient and Historic Metals, Santa Monica 1991. (online)
Scott, D.A. Ancient and Historic Metals - Conservation and Scientific Research, Santa Monica 1994. (online)
Scott, D.A. Copper and Bronze in Art - Corrosion, Colorants, Conservation, Los Angeles 2002.(online)
Cronyn, J.M. The Elements of Archaeological Conservation, London 1990.
Rodgers, B. The Archaeologist Manual for Conservation - A Guide to Non-toxic, Minimal Intervention Artifact Stabilization, New York 2004.
La Niece,S. and Craddock,P. Metal Plating and Patination: Cultural, Technical and Historical Developments, Boston 1993.

Copper
Conservation and restoration of cultural heritage